The 1969–70 Delaware Fightin' Blue Hens women's basketball team represented the University of Delaware during the 1969-70 school year. A committee approached the university's athletic council in early 1969 to gain approval for the university to begin sanctioning women's intercollegiate sports. Women's basketball, field hockey, and swimming were approved on an experimental two-year basis. Delaware played a six game season, finishing with a 1-5 record.

Roster

Schedule

|-
!colspan=9 style=| Non-conference regular season

References

 
Delaware Fightin' Blue Hens women's basketball seasons